Rodney Nkele Kongolo (born 9 January 1998) is a Dutch professional footballer who plays as a midfielder.

Club career

Manchester City
Born in Rotterdam, Kongolo started out at Feyenoord's youth academy. His performance for the Netherlands U20 side in February 2013 attracted interest from Premier League sides Arsenal, Chelsea and Manchester City. Because he was 15 at the time, there were concerns for Feyenoord, as Kongolo’s departure could leave the club with no compensation and previously saw their youth talents depart in recent years, such as, Nathan Aké, Jeffrey Bruma and Kyle Ebecilio. Eventually, Kongolo moved from Feyenoord to Manchester City in March 2014, immediately sent to the development squad and because he was 16 at the time, they would pay Feyenoord compensation. Later in July 2014, he signed his first professional contract with the club.

At Manchester City development side, Kongolo progressed through for both City U18s and the Elite Development Squad, as he played in a box-to-box role and in a more defensive position. Along the way, he also developed as captain for the development squad in UEFA Youth League and later in the Premier League 2. At the end of the 2016–17 season, Kongolo was named Player’s Player for the EDS.

By the time of his departure from Manchester City, Kongolo failed to make a first team breakthrough and made no first team appearances for the side.

Loan spell at Doncaster Rovers
On 3 August 2017, Kongolo signed on loan for Doncaster Rovers on a six-month loan.

He made his Doncaster Rovers debut, where he came on as a substitute for Matty Blair in the 70th minutes, in a 0–0 draw against Gillingham in the opening game of the season. In a follow–up match, he scored his first goal for Doncaster Rovers in a 3-2 EFL Cup win at Bradford City on 8 August 2017. Since joining the club, Kongolo established himself in the first team, where he was featured in the midfield position. On 4 January 2018, his performance at Doncaster Rovers saw his loan extended until the end of the season. Towards the end of the season, his playing time soon saw him coming off from the substitute bench. At the end of the 2017–18 season, Kongolo finished his time at Doncaster Rovers, making 42 appearances and scoring once in all competitions.

Heerenveen
Kongolo signed a three-year contract with Heerenveen on 18 July 2018. The transfer fee was in the region of £750,000.

He made his SC Heerenveen debut, where he came on as a substitute for Nemanja Mihajlović in the 57th minutes, in a 3–2 win over PEC Zwolle in the opening game of the season. He then made his first start on 17 August 2018, where he started the whole game, in a 3–2 win over Vitesse.

Cosenza
On 31 January 2022, Kongolo signed with Cosenza in Italy. On 16 January 2023, his contract with Cosenza was terminated by mutual consent.

International career
Kongolo is a Dutch youth international, playing from under-16 to under-20 levels. In January 2013, Kongolo was called up for the Netherlands U15 squad for the first time. It wasn’t until on 16 April 2013 where he captained the whole game, in a 0–0 draw against Belgium U15. He captained the U15 side once again, in a 4–1 loss against Germany U15 on 14 May 2013. He went on to make four appearances for the Netherlands U15 between April 2013 and May 2013.

In September 2013, Kongolo was called up for the Netherlands U16 squad for the first time. A month later, on 29 October 2013, he made his Netherlands U16 debut, where he came on as a substitute in the 70th minutes, in a 2–1 win over Belgium U16. Two days later, on 31 October 2013, he made his first start, in a 2–1 loss against France U16. Kongolo went on to make nine appearances for the U16 side between October 2013 and May 2014.

In September 2014, Kongolo was called up to the Netherlands U17 squad for the first time. He made his Netherlands U17 debut on 10 September2014, in a 3–3 draw against Germany U17. Kongolo went on to make four appearances for the U17 side between September 2014 and October 2014.

In August 2015, Kongolo was called up to the Netherlands U18 squad for the first time. He made his Netherlands U18 debut, where he started the whole game, in a 2–0 loss against England U18 on 3 September 2015. Kongolo went on to make six appearances for the U18 side between September 2015 and March 2016.

In August 2016, Kongolo was called up to the Netherlands U19 squad for the first time. He made his Netherlands U19 debut on 1 September 2016, where he played 70 minutes, in a 1–1 draw against England U19. A month later on 8 October 2016, he set up a goal for Kaj Sierhuis, who scored a hat–trick, in a 4–0 loss win over San Marino U19. In June 2017, he was called up by the Netherlands U19 squad for the UEFA European Under-19 Championship. Kongolo then scored his first goal for the U19 side, in a 1–1 draw against Bulgaria U19 on 9 July 2017. He went on to make four appearances throughout the tournament, as Netherlands U19 were eliminated in the semi–finals against Portugal U19. He went on to make eleven appearances for the Netherlands U19 side.

In August 2017, Kongolo was called up by Netherlands U20 for the first time. He made his Netherlands U20 debut on 4 September 2017, where he started the whole game, in a 1–0 win over Portugal U20.

Personal life
Kongolo is of Congolese descent, making him eligible to play for DR Congo. He has two brothers who are also both footballers, Terence and Fidel.

In addition to speaking Dutch, Kongolo speaks English and French.

Career statistics

References

1998 births
Living people
Footballers from Rotterdam
Dutch people of Democratic Republic of the Congo descent
Dutch footballers
Feyenoord players
Manchester City F.C. players
Doncaster Rovers F.C. players
SC Heerenveen players
Cosenza Calcio players
English Football League players
Eredivisie players
Association football midfielders
Dutch expatriate footballers
Dutch expatriate sportspeople in England
Expatriate footballers in England
Dutch expatriate sportspeople in Italy
Expatriate footballers in Italy
Netherlands youth international footballers